"Tall Dark Stranger" is a 1969 single written and recorded by Buck Owens.  "Tall Dark Stranger" was Buck Owens' twentieth number one on the country chart, spending a single week at the top and a total of thirteen weeks on the charts.

Chart performance

Music Video
A video for the song was taped for the TV series Hee Haw, on which Owens was a co-host. The video is set in a wild west town, and during the musical bridge the song's main theme – a handsome stranger, tall and dressed in black clothing, stealing the heart of a young man's girlfriend and the woman riding off with him – is played out, said incident happening as Owens (cast as the protagonist) and the woman are walking out of a saloon. The video has since aired on Great American Country and CMT.

References

Buck Owens songs
1969 singles
Songs written by Buck Owens
Song recordings produced by Ken Nelson (American record producer)
Capitol Records singles
1969 songs